Cheong Poong Bridge is a cable-stayed bridge which crosses the lake formed by Chungju Dam (part of the Namhan River system, a tributary of the Han River) in North Chungcheong Province, South Korea on Route 82 in that region.

The bridge project began in December 2004 and was scheduled to be completed in September 2010, to replace an existing PSC box girder bridge which had required periodical rehabilitation and repair work.  As the area where the bridge was constructed has well-known natural scenery and attractions, it designed to support tourism development plans.

Construction and design
The bridge was built by contractor Daelim Industrial Co., LTD, at a contract price of 40.3 million USD. Concrete pylon height with typical H-shape is 103m and constructed by auto climbing form. The main span of 327m across the lake is constructed using the free cantilever method and the side span of 57.5m is constructed by the full staging method.
The combination of composite section (reinforced concrete deck and I-shaped steel girder) for the center span and concrete section for side spans applied to the bridge because of decreasing effect of weight balance.  Concrete pylon has typical H-shape.  The leg shape beneath the superstructure level, on the other hand, needs to be narrow down a little bit to make the size of foundation smaller mainly for less rock excavation at foundation locations and better handling of construction unit (caisson) considering the site condition.  Cable is a multi strand system as two planes semi-fan.  An extra pier support in each side span has been applied.  To maximize the counter weight effect by concrete girder at side span, it is necessary to make the side span heavier as possible and not to have excessive bending moment by increasing dead load at the same time. Here, the extra pier support gives more opportunity for having more weight and stiffness in side span without resulting in excessive bending moment in girders and pylons.

Gallery

See also
 Transportation in South Korea
 List of bridges in South Korea

References

Cable-stayed bridges in South Korea
Bridges completed in 2010
Buildings and structures in North Chungcheong Province